Events from the year 1942 in Taiwan, Empire of Japan.

Incumbents

Central government of Japan
 Prime Minister: Hideki Tōjō

Taiwan
 Governor-General – Kiyoshi Hasegawa

Events

April
 1 April – The establishment of Yilan Middle School in Taihoku Prefecture.

October
 26 October – The beam raising ceremony for the construction of First Guesthouse in Hōko Prefecture.

Births
 26 June – Lin Tsung-nan, Magistrate of Nantou County (2001–2005).
 1 July – Timothy Yang, Minister of Foreign Affairs (2009–2012).
 21 July – Chang Fu-hsing, Magistrate of Hualien County (2001–2003).
 20 November – Fan Chen-tsung, Magistrate of Hsinchu County (1989–1997).

References

 
Years of the 20th century in Taiwan